The 1950–51 NHL season was the 34th season of the National Hockey League. The Toronto Maple Leafs defeated the Montreal Canadiens four games to one for the Stanley Cup to win their fifth Cup in seven years.

League business
The league implemented a rule requiring all teams to provide an emergency goaltender for every game, for use by either team in case of illness or injury.

Regular season
The biggest trade in NHL history at the time took place in July 1950 with Sugar Jim Henry, Gaye Stewart, Bob Goldham and Metro Prystai of Chicago going to Detroit for Harry Lumley, Black Jack Stewart, Al Dewsbury, Don Morrison and Pete Babando, an exchange of nine players altogether.

Joe Primeau was named coach of the Toronto Maple Leafs with Hap Day kicked upstairs to assistant general manager. Toronto came flying out of the gate, undefeated in 11 games. Al Rollins had a great year, finishing with a 1.75 goals against average in 40 games. The Leafs had hoped to have Rollins share the Vezina Trophy with Turk Broda, but the league decided Rollins alone would be the recipient. The Leafs' .679 win percentage remains their all time best for a season, despite the fact that they were second in the league standings behind Detroit.

With the New York Rangers slumping this season, they hired a hypnotist, Dr. David Tracy, to help relax the team. The treatment remained in doubt and the Rangers lost to Boston November 12. Asked why the treatment didn't work, Dr. Tracy said that he should have worked with the goaltender (Chuck Rayner) as he wasn't relaxed enough.

Montreal fans were excited when it was reported that two junior stars, Jean Beliveau and Bernie Geoffrion, would be given a trial in a December 16 game with the Rangers. The Canadiens played a 1–1 tie before 14,158 fans. Geoffrion scored the Canadiens goal in his debut.

Chicago was in third place at mid-season when bad luck struck. Their captain, Black Jack Stewart, ruptured a disc in his back and had to undergo surgery. He was finished for the season
and his career was in jeopardy. Aggravating things were injuries to Gus Bodnar and Bill Gadsby. The Black Hawks won only two games in the second half and finished last.

In March, Rocket Richard ran into trouble in a game with Detroit. Richard was tripped and
rose with a cut between the eyes. No penalty was called and Richard commenced an argument
with referee Hugh McLean. He continued his argument too long and was given a misconduct penalty.
Richard then skated to the penalty box and found Leo Reise of Detroit there to welcome him
with derisive remarks which infuriated Richard, who then punched Reise, and when linesman
Jim Primeau rushed to intervene, Richard took a poke at him and Richard was given a game misconduct. The Canadiens took a train to New York for a game against the Rangers, and
the next morning, Richard encountered referee McLean and linesman Primeau in the lobby of the Picadilly Hotel. No punches were thrown, but Richard grabbed McLean by the tie and then
Primeau intervened. Considerable profanity filled the air, but cooler heads separated the
trio before fists could fly. NHL President Clarence Campbell took a dim view of the matter
and fined the Rocket $500 for conduct prejudicial to the welfare of hockey.

The Detroit Red Wings got hot in the second half, overtaking Toronto and finished in first place again, becoming the first team with more than 100 points. Gordie Howe led the NHL in goals, assists, and points while goaltender Terry Sawchuk won the Calder Memorial Trophy as the league's best rookie. Sawchuk set a record for most wins by a goalie, as he was in net for all 44 Detroit victories.

Final standings

Playoffs
The second seed Toronto Maple Leafs eliminated the fourth seed Boston Bruins in five games, and the third seed Montreal Canadiens upset the first overall Detroit Red Wings in six, setting up a Leafs – Canadiens Stanley Cup Finals, won by the Leafs 4–1.

Playoff bracket

Semifinals

(1) Detroit Red Wings vs. (3) Montreal Canadiens

(2) Toronto Maple Leafs vs. (4) Boston Bruins
Game two was the last Stanley Cup playoff overtime game to end in a tie. The game was played on a Saturday night and as game crept closer to midnight it had to be stopped due to city bylaws and the federal Lord's Day Act that were in effect at the time in Toronto. These laws prevented businesses from operating on Sunday.

Stanley Cup Finals

Awards

Player statistics

Scoring leaders
Note: GP = Games played; G = Goals; A = Assists; Pts = Points

Source: NHL

Leading goaltenders

Note: GP = Games played; Min = Minutes played; GA = Goals against; GAA = Goals against average; W = Wins; L = Losses; T = Ties; SO = Shutouts

Coaches
Boston Bruins: Lynn Patrick
Chicago Black Hawks: Ebbie Goodfellow
Detroit Red Wings: Tommy Ivan
Montreal Canadiens: Dick Irvin
New York Rangers: Neil Colville
Toronto Maple Leafs: Joe Primeau

Debuts
The following is a list of players of note who played their first NHL game in 1950–51 (listed with their first team, asterisk(*) marks debut in playoffs):
Alex Delvecchio, Detroit Red Wings
Bernie Geoffrion, Montreal Canadiens
Jean Beliveau, Montreal Canadiens
Dollard St. Laurent, Montreal Canadiens
Danny Lewicki, Toronto Maple Leafs

Last games
The following is a list of players of note that played their last game in the NHL in 1950–51 (listed with their last team):
Joe Carveth, Detroit Red Wings
Glen Harmon, Montreal Canadiens
Wally Stanowski, New York Rangers
Pat Egan, New York Rangers (last active New York American)
Buddy O'Connor, New York Rangers
Bill Barilko, Toronto Maple Leafs
Johnny Peirson, Boston Bruins

See also 
 1950-51 NHL transactions
 List of Stanley Cup champions
 4th National Hockey League All-Star Game
 National Hockey League All-Star Game
 1950 in sports
 1951 in sports

References 
Notes

Bibliography

External links
 Hockey Database
 NHL.com

 
1950–51 in American ice hockey by league
1950–51 in Canadian ice hockey by league